A red giant is a luminous giant star of low or intermediate mass (roughly 0.3–8 solar masses) in a late phase of stellar evolution. The appearance of the red giant is from yellow-white to reddish-orange, including the spectral types K and M, sometimes G, but also class S stars and most carbon stars.

Red giants vary in the way by which they generate energy:

 most common red giants are stars on the red-giant branch (RGB) that are still fusing hydrogen into helium in a shell surrounding an inert helium core
 red-clump stars in the cool half of the horizontal branch, fusing helium into carbon in their cores via the triple-alpha process
 asymptotic-giant-branch (AGB) stars with a helium burning shell outside a degenerate carbon–oxygen core, and a hydrogen-burning shell just beyond that.

Many of the well-known bright stars are red giants because they are luminous and moderately common. The K0 RGB star Arcturus is 36 light-years away, and Gamma Crucis is the nearest M-class giant at 88 light-years' distance.

A red giant will usually produce a planetary nebula and become a white dwarf at the end of its life.

Characteristics

A red giant is a star that has exhausted the supply of hydrogen in its core and has begun thermonuclear fusion of hydrogen in a shell surrounding the core. They have radii tens to hundreds of times larger than that of the Sun. However, their outer envelope is lower in temperature, giving them a yellowish-orange hue. Despite the lower energy density of their envelope, red giants are many times more luminous than the Sun because of their great size. Red-giant-branch stars have luminosities up to nearly three thousand times that of the Sun, spectral types of K or M, have surface temperatures of 3,000–4,000 K, and radii up to about 200 times the Sun. Asymptotic-giant-branch stars range from similar luminosities as the brighter stars of the red-giant branch, up to several times more luminous at the end of the thermal pulsing phase.

Among the asymptotic-giant-branch stars belong the carbon stars of type C-N and late C-R, produced when carbon and other elements are convected to the surface in what is called a dredge-up. The first dredge-up occurs during hydrogen shell burning on the red-giant branch, but does not produce a large carbon abundance at the surface. The second, and sometimes third, dredge up occurs during helium shell burning on the asymptotic-giant branch and convects carbon to the surface in sufficiently massive stars.

The stellar limb of a red giant is not sharply defined, contrary to their depiction in many illustrations. Rather, due to the very low mass density of the envelope, such stars lack a well-defined photosphere, and the body of the star gradually transitions into a 'corona'. The coolest red giants have complex spectra, with molecular lines, emission features, and sometimes masers, particularly from thermally pulsing AGB stars. Observations have also provided evidence of a hot chromosphere above the photosphere of red giants, where investigating the heating mechanisms for the chromospheres to form requires 3D simulations of red giants.

Another noteworthy feature of red giants is that, unlike Sun-like stars whose photospheres have a large number of small convection cells (solar granules), red-giant photospheres, as well as those of red supergiants, have just a few large cells, the features of which cause the variations of brightness so common on both types of stars.

Evolution

When a star initially forms from a collapsing molecular cloud in the interstellar medium, it contains primarily hydrogen and helium, with trace amounts of "metals" (in stellar structure, this simply refers to any element that is not hydrogen or helium i.e. atomic number greater than 2). These elements are all uniformly mixed throughout the star. The star reaches the main sequence when the core reaches a temperature high enough to begin fusing hydrogen (a few million kelvin) and establishes hydrostatic equilibrium. Over its main sequence life, the star slowly converts the hydrogen in the core into helium; its main-sequence life ends when nearly all the hydrogen in the core has been fused. For the Sun, the main-sequence lifetime is approximately 10 billion years. More-massive stars burn disproportionately faster and so have a shorter lifetime than less massive stars.

When the star exhausts the hydrogen fuel in its core, nuclear reactions can no longer continue and so the core begins to contract due to its gravity. This brings additional hydrogen into a zone where the temperature and pressure are sufficient to cause fusion to resume in a shell around the core. The hydrogen-burning shell results in a situation that has been described as the mirror principle; when the core within the shell contracts, the layers of the star outside the shell must expand. The detailed physical processes that cause this are complex. Still, the behavior is necessary to satisfy simultaneous conservation of gravitational and thermal energy in a star with the shell structure. The core contracts and heats up due to the lack of fusion, and so the outer layers of the star expand greatly, absorbing most of the extra energy from shell fusion. This process of cooling and expanding is the subgiant star. When the envelope of the star cools sufficiently it becomes convective, the star stops expanding, its luminosity starts to increase, and the star is ascending the red-giant branch of the Hertzsprung–Russell (H–R) diagram.

The evolutionary path the star takes as it moves along the red-giant branch depends on the mass of the star. For the Sun and stars of less than about  the core will become dense enough that electron degeneracy pressure will prevent it from collapsing further. Once the core is degenerate, it will continue to heat until it reaches a temperature of roughly 108 K, hot enough to begin fusing helium to carbon via the triple-alpha process. Once the degenerate core reaches this temperature, the entire core will begin helium fusion nearly simultaneously in a so-called helium flash. In more-massive stars, the collapsing core will reach 108 K before it is dense enough to be degenerate, so helium fusion will begin much more smoothly, and produce no helium flash. The core helium fusing phase of a star's life is called the horizontal branch in metal-poor stars, so named because these stars lie on a nearly horizontal line in the H–R diagram of many star clusters. Metal-rich helium-fusing stars instead lie on the so-called red clump in the H–R diagram.

An analogous process occurs when the central helium is exhausted and the star collapses once again, causing helium in a shell to begin fusing. At the same time, hydrogen may begin fusion in a shell just outside the burning helium shell. This puts the star onto the asymptotic giant branch, a second red-giant phase. The helium fusion results in the build-up of a carbon–oxygen core. A star below about  will never start fusion in its degenerate carbon–oxygen core. Instead, at the end of the asymptotic-giant-branch phase the star will eject its outer layers, forming a planetary nebula with the core of the star exposed, ultimately becoming a white dwarf. The ejection of the outer mass and the creation of a planetary nebula finally ends the red-giant phase of the star's evolution. The red-giant phase typically lasts only around a billion years in total for a solar mass star, almost all of which is spent on the red-giant branch. The horizontal-branch and asymptotic-giant-branch phases proceed tens of times faster.

These "intermediate" stars cool somewhat and increase their luminosity but never achieve the tip of the red-giant branch and helium core flash. When the ascent of the red-giant branch ends they puff off their outer layers much like a post-asymptotic-giant-branch star and then become a white dwarf.

Stars that do not become red giants

Very-low-mass stars are fully convective and may continue to fuse hydrogen into helium for up to a trillion years until only a small fraction of the entire star is hydrogen. Luminosity and temperature steadily increase during this time, just as for more-massive main-sequence stars, but the length of time involved means that the temperature eventually increases by about 50% and the luminosity by around 10 times. Eventually the level of helium increases to the point where the star ceases to be fully convective and the remaining hydrogen locked in the core is consumed in only a few billion more years. Depending on mass, the temperature and luminosity continue to increase for a time during hydrogen shell burning, the star can become hotter than the Sun and tens of times more luminous than when it formed although still not as luminous as the Sun. After some billions more years, they start to become less luminous and cooler even though hydrogen shell burning continues. These become cool helium white dwarfs.

Very-high-mass stars develop into supergiants that follow an evolutionary track that takes them back and forth horizontally over the H–R diagram, at the right end constituting red supergiants. These usually end their life as a type II supernova. The most massive stars can become Wolf–Rayet stars without becoming giants or supergiants at all.

Planets

Red giants with known planets: the M-type HD 208527, HD 220074 and, as of February 2014, a few tens of known K-giants including Pollux, Gamma Cephei and Iota Draconis.

Prospects for habitability

Although traditionally it has been suggested the evolution of a star into a red giant will render its planetary system, if present, uninhabitable, some research suggests that, during the evolution of a  star along the red-giant branch, it could harbor a habitable zone for several billion years at 2 astronomical units (AU) out to around 100 million years at 9 AU out, giving perhaps enough time for life to develop on a suitable world. After the red-giant stage, there would for such a star be a habitable zone between 7 and 22 AU for an additional one billion years. Later studies have refined this scenario, showing how for a  star the habitable zone lasts from 100 million years for a planet with an orbit similar to that of Mars to 210 million years for one that orbits at Saturn's distance to the Sun, the maximum time (370 million years) corresponding for planets orbiting at the distance of Jupiter. However, planets orbiting a  star in equivalent orbits to those of Jupiter and Saturn would be in the habitable zone for 5.8 billion years and 2.1 billion years, respectively; for stars more massive than the Sun, the times are considerably shorter.

Enlargement of planets

As of June 2014, fifty giant planets have been discovered around giant stars. However, these giant planets are more massive than the giant planets found around solar-type stars. This could be because giant stars are more massive than the Sun (less massive stars will still be on the main sequence and will not have become giants yet) and more massive stars are expected to have more massive planets. However, the masses of the planets that have been found around giant stars do not correlate with the masses of the stars; therefore, the planets could be growing in mass during the stars' red giant phase. The growth in planet mass could be partly due to accretion from stellar wind, although a much larger effect would be Roche lobe overflow causing mass-transfer from the star to the planet when the giant expands out to the orbital distance of the planet.

Well known examples
Many of the well-known bright stars are red giants, because they are luminous and moderately common. The red-giant branch variable star Gamma Crucis is the nearest M-class giant star at 88 light-years. The K1.5 red-giant branch star Arcturus is 36 light-years away.

Red-giant branch
 Aldebaran (α Tauri)
 Arcturus (α Bootis)
 Gacrux (γ Crucis)

Red-clump giants
 Capella Aa (α Aurigae)
 Hamal (α Arietis)
 κ Persei
 δ Andromedae

Asymptotic giant branch
 Mira (ο Ceti)
 χ Cygni
 α Herculis

The Sun as a red giant
 
The Sun will exit the main sequence in approximately 5 billion years and start to turn into a red giant. As a red giant, the Sun will grow so large (over 200 times its present-day radius) that it will engulf Mercury, Venus, and likely Earth.

References

External links

 
Star types